Waits may refer to:

Waits (surname)
Waits, California, former name of Oildale, California
Waits River, in Vermont
WAITS, time-sharing operating system

See also
Wait (musician)
Wates (disambiguation)